Events from the year 1851 in Russia

Incumbents
 Monarch – Nicholas I

Events

  911
 Saint Petersburg – Moscow Railway
 Moscow Passazhirskaya railway station
 Moskovsky railway station (Saint Petersburg)
 Russian Railway Troops

Births

Deaths

References

1851 in Russia
Years of the 19th century in the Russian Empire